Melanoplus fasciatus, known generally as huckleberry grasshopper, is a species of spur-throated grasshopper in the family Acrididae. Other common names include the huckleberry spur-throat grasshopper and huckleberry locust. It is found in North America.

References

External links

 

Melanoplinae
Articles created by Qbugbot
Insects described in 1870